Edwin Raymond Corley (born 2 October 1931 in Bayonne, New Jersey – died 7 November 1981 in Gulfport, Mississippi) was a United States novelist most famous for his thrillers Sargasso, Air Force One, and The Jesus Factor. He used the pseudonyms "David Harper", "William Judson", and "Will Collins" and worked with novelist Jack Murphy, using the pseudonym "Patrick Buchanan" (unrelated to Patrick Buchanan, the politician of the same name).

As "Patrick Buchanan", Corley and Murphy wrote a series of novels (A Murder of Crows, 1970; A Parliament of Owls, 1971; A Requiem of Sharks, 1973; and A Sounder of Swine, 1974) featuring the character Charity Tucker, a tall, blonde, intelligent television reporter, who teamed with private investigator Ben Shock to investigate various murders.

Corley's Hollywood-centered and partly factual novel, Shadows (1975), was the first work of fiction to feature Dorothy Parker appearing as herself.  Other major characters are William Randolph Hearst, his paramour Marion Davies, and Vivien Leigh.

References

External links
 Select bibliography at Fantasticfiction.co.uk
 Edwin Corley Biographical site

1931 births
1981 deaths
20th-century American novelists
American male novelists
20th-century American male writers